Vicar Street has hosted some of the world's best known performers and comedy acts from around the world. Here are some of the acts that have performed at the venue.

Comedy Performances

Music Performances

References

Lists of events in Ireland
Lists of events by venue